Breed-specific legislation (BSL) is a type of law that prohibits or restricts particular breeds or types of dog. Such laws range from outright bans on the possession of these dogs, to restrictions and conditions on ownership, and often establishes a legal presumption that such dogs are dangerous or vicious to prevent dog attacks. Some jurisdictions have enacted breed-specific legislation in response to a number of fatalities or maulings involving pit bull–type dogs or other dog breeds commonly used in dog fighting, and some government organizations such as the United States Army and Marine Corps have taken administrative action as well. Due to opposition to such laws, anti-BSL laws have been passed in 21 of the 50 state-level governments in the United States, prohibiting or restricting the ability of jurisdictions within those states to enact or enforce breed-specific legislation.

Background

It is generally settled in case law that jurisdictions in the United States and Canada have the right to enact breed-specific legislation; however, the appropriateness and effectiveness of breed-specific legislation in preventing dog bite fatalities and injuries is disputed. One point of view is that certain dog breeds are a public safety issue that merits actions such as banning ownership, mandatory spaying/neutering for all dogs of these breeds, mandatory microchip implants and liability insurance, or prohibiting people convicted of a felony from owning them. Another point of view is that comprehensive "dog bite" legislation, coupled with better consumer education and legally mandating responsible pet keeping practices, is a better solution than breed-specific legislation to the problem of dangerous dogs.

A third point of view is that breed-specific legislation should not ban breeds entirely, but should strictly regulate the conditions under which specific breeds could be owned, e.g., forbidding certain classes of individuals from owning them, specifying public areas in which they would be prohibited, and establishing conditions, such as requiring a dog to wear a muzzle, for taking dogs from specific breeds into public places. Finally, some governments, such as that of Australia, have forbidden the import of specific breeds and require all existing dogs of these breeds to be spayed/neutered in an attempt to eliminate the population slowly through natural attrition.

Approximately 550 jurisdictions in the United States have enacted breed-specific legislation in response to a number of well-publicized incidents involving pit bull–type dogs, and some government organizations such as the U.S. Army and Marine Corps have taken administrative action as well. These actions range from outright bans on the possession of pit bull–type dogs, to restrictions and conditions on pit bull ownership. They often establish a legal presumption that a pit bull–type dog is prima facie a legally "dangerous" or "vicious" dog. In response, 16 states in the U.S. prohibited or restricted the ability of municipal governments within those states to enact BSL, though these restrictions do not affect military installations located within the states.

Studies
In a 2014 literature review, the American Veterinary Medical Association stated that "controlled studies have not identified this breed group as disproportionately dangerous", and that "it has not been demonstrated that introducing a breed-specific ban will reduce the rate or severity of bite injuries occurring in the community". In 2012, the American Bar Association passed a resolution urging the repeal of breed-specific legislation, stating that it is "ineffective at improving public safety". In 2013, researchers in Canada found no difference in incidence of dog bites between municipalities with breed-specific legislation and those without it, and in 2008, the Dutch government repealed a 15 year ban on pit bulls, concluding the law was ineffective.

A 2017 study examining dog-bite characteristics in Ireland has suggested that targetting specific dog breeds can have significant negative outcomes. The study found that no significant difference existed between legislated and non-legislated dog breeds for the type of bite inflicted, and the medical treatment needed after the bite. The authors found that non-legislated dog breeds were less likely to be reported to the authorities both before and after the bite compared to legislated dog breeds. The publication suggests there is no scientifically valid basis for breed-specific legislation, and suggests significant negative consequences may result from its introduction.

A study by the US Centers for Disease Control and Prevention (CDC) in 2000 concluded that fatal attacks on humans appeared to be a breed-specific problem (pit bull–type dogs and Rottweilers accounted for half of all fatal dog attacks on humans between 1979 and 1998). However, they also concluded that fatal attacks represent a small proportion of dog bite injuries to humans and suggested that there may be better alternatives for prevention of dog bites than breed-specific ordinances. Given many media sources reported that this study suggested that pit bull–type dogs and Rottweilers are disproportionately more dangerous than other dog breeds(Fatal dog attacks in USA & Canada 1982 – 2019).The American Veterinary Medical Association, whose journal published the original article, released a statement detailing that this study "cannot be used to infer any breed specific risk for dog bite fatalities" (for lack of sufficient data on total breed ownership).

Legislation

Fifty-two countries have some form of breed-specific legislation, and 41 of those have BSL at the national level, as of December 2018.

North America

Bermuda
In Bermuda, since, July 21, 2003, importing or breeding of any "breed of dog that may be perceived as dangerous" is prohibited. Prohibited breeds include: American Pit Bull Terrier, American Bulldog, American Staffordshire Terrier, Dogo Argentino, Boerboel, Fila Brasiliero, Cane Corso, Presa Canario, Neapolitan Mastiff, Tosa Inu, Wolf or Wolf hybrid, and crossbreeds thereof, as well as "any exotic or uncommon breed" at the government's discretion.

Another category, restricted breeds, may be imported/kept once the conditions for keeping these dogs have been fulfilled, new acquisitions require pre-approval, and they may be bred only with a Breeder’s permit. Restricted breeds include: Akita, Australian Cattle Dog, Belgian Malinois, Bouvier Des Flandres, Bull Terrier, Bullmastiff, Chow Chow, Doberman Pinscher, Dogue De Bordeaux, German Shepherd, English Mastiff, Rhodesian Ridgeback, Rottweiler, Staffordshire Bull Terrier, and any cross of these.

Canada

The Canadian federal government does not regulate pit bull–type dogs, but two provincial governments and some municipal governments in Canada have enacted breed-specific legislation banning or restricting pit bull–type dogs. The following table discusses a sampling of the restrictions in force.

United States
As of 2018 there is some level of breed-specific legislation in 37 states and over 1,000 cities. Though the Federal Government of the United States has not enacted breed-specific legislation, four of the five branches of the United States Armed Forces have restricted certain breeds at almost 300 installations (mostly with respect to on-base housing and privatized housing). Over 20 American Indian Reservations have also enacted BSL.

The following 17 states prohibit their municipalities from passing breed-specific laws: Colorado, Florida, Illinois, Maine, Minnesota, New Jersey, New York, Oklahoma, Pennsylvania, Texas, Virginia, Massachusetts, Nevada, Connecticut, Rhode Island, Utah and South Dakota. California prohibits most breed-specific laws, but allows breed-specific spay/neuter.

There have been at least 60 municipality BSL repeals in the U.S. since 2018.

Below are summaries of some of the breed-specific legislation enacted in the United States. This is not an all-inclusive list of BSL throughout the USA.

Central and South America

Europe

Republic of Ireland

The Control of Dogs Regulations, 1998  place controls on 12 breeds of dogs: American Pit Bull Terrier, English Bull Terrier, Staffordshire Bull Terrier, Dogo Argentino, Bull Mastiff, Doberman Pinscher, German Shepherd (Alsatian), Rhodesian Ridgeback, Rottweiler, Japanese Akita, Japanese Tosa, and Bandog. These dogs, or strains and crosses thereof, must be kept on a strong, short lead (less than 2 metres / 6′ 7″) by a person over 16 years of age who is capable of controlling them. The dogs must be securely muzzled and wear a collar with the name and address of the owner.

United Kingdom

In the United Kingdom the main piece of breed-specific legislation is the Dangerous Dogs Act 1991, which makes it illegal to own any 'Specially Controlled Dogs' without specific exemption from a court. The dogs have to be muzzled and kept on a lead in public, they must be registered and insured, neutered, tattooed and receive microchip implants. The Act also bans the breeding, sale and exchange of these dogs, even if they are on the 'Index of Exempted Dogs'.

Two types of dogs are specifically identified by the Act:

 Pit Bull Terrier
 Japanese Tosa

In addition, the Dangerous Dogs (Designated Types) Order 1991, a statutory instrument made under this Act, designated two more types as "appearing to be bred for fighting or to have the characteristics of types bred for that purpose":
 Dogo Argentino
 Fila Brasileiro

The Act also covers cross-breeds of the above four types of dog. Dangerous dogs are classified by "type", not by breed label. This means that whether a dog is prohibited under the Act will depend on a judgement about its physical characteristics, and whether they match the description of a prohibited "type". This assessment of the physical characteristics is made by a court.

The Act applies in England, Wales and Scotland, with the Dangerous Dogs (Northern Ireland) Order 1991 having a similar effect in Northern Ireland.

Other European countries

Asia

Oceania

Opposition

Legal challenges, Ontario 2007-2009
 
In Cochrane v. Ontario (Attorney General), 2007 CanLII 9231 (ON S.C.), Ms. Catherine Cochrane sued the Province of Ontario to prevent it from enforcing the Dog Owner's Liability Act (DOLA) ban on pit bull–type dogs, arguing that the law was unconstitutionally broad because the ban was grossly disproportionate to the risk pit bulls pose to public safety, and that the law was unconstitutionally vague because it failed to provide an intelligible definition of pit bulls. She also argued that a provision allowing the Crown to introduce as evidence a veterinarian's certificate certifying that the dog is a pit bull violates the right to a fair trial and the presumption of innocence.

The presiding judge ruled that the DOLA was not overbroad because,
"The evidence with respect to the dangerousness of pit bulls, although conflicting and inconclusive, is sufficient, in my opinion, to constitute a 'reasoned apprehension of harm'. In the face of conflicting evidence as to the feasibility of less restrictive means to protect the public, it was open to the legislature to decide to restrict the ownership of all pit bulls."

The presiding judge found the term "a pit bull terrier" was unconstitutionally vague since it could include an undefined number of dogs similar to the American Pit Bull Terrier, American Staffordshire Terrier, and Staffordshire Bull Terrier. The judge also ruled that the government's ability to introduce a veterinarian's certificate certifying that the dog is a pit bull created a mandatory presumption that the dog was a pit bull, and that this placed an unconstitutional burden of proof upon the defendant.

In 2008, both Ms. Cochrane and the Attorney General of Ontario appealed different aspects of the decision to the Court of Appeal for Ontario.
In Cochrane v. Ontario (2008 ONCA 718), the Court of Appeal reversed the lower court's ruling:
 It agreed with the lower court judge in finding that the "overbreadth" claim failed because the legislature had acted on a "reasonable apprehension of harm".
 It disagreed that the definition of pit bull in the Act was insufficiently precise and restored the original wording of "pit bull terrier" on the basis that, when read in the context of "a more comprehensive definition", the phrasing "a pit bull terrier" was sufficiently precise.
 It reversed the trial court and found that the government's ability to introduce a veterinarian's certificate certifying a dog was a pit bull would constitute proof only if the defendant failed to answer the claim: it was therefore a tactical burden, rather an evidentiary burden.

On June 11, 2009 the Supreme Court of Canada declined to hear further appeal of the case, thereby upholding the Ontario ban on pit bulls.

Legal challenges, USA
Court challenges to breed-specific legislation on constitutional grounds have been largely unsuccessful. Dana M. Campbell summarized the legal challenges and the general court findings as of July 2009:
Court cases challenging BSL have focused on constitutional concerns such as substantive due process, equal protection, and vagueness. Most BSL will survive the minimum scrutiny analysis allowed by the due process clauses of the Constitution's Fifth and Fourteenth Amendments because there is no fundamental right at issue. This analysis requires that the law being challenged must be rationally related to a legitimate government goal or purpose. Because state and local jurisdictions enjoy broad police powers, including protecting the public's safety and welfare, courts have not had trouble finding that BSL is rationally related to the goal of protecting the public from allegedly dangerous breeds.

This has caused big problems for many who use them as police, guide or other service dogs, as they are not always excluded, and in some cases are confiscated and put down.

Challenges based on equal protection arguments are similarly difficult to sustain. Here courts are looking at whether there is a rational purpose for treating pit bull breeds differently from other dog breeds. Dog owners have attacked the rational purpose requirement by arguing either that BSL is over-inclusive, because it bans all dogs of a breed when only certain individuals within the breed have proven to be vicious, or under-inclusive, because many types of dogs have injured people and the BSL fails to include those other breeds. However, again under minimum scrutiny review, BSL will survive as long as the government can establish that the BSL is rationally related to its purpose, even if the law is found to be over-inclusive or under-inclusive.

Claims that BSL is unconstitutionally vague have brought dog owners mixed success. Procedural due process requires that laws provide the public with sufficient notice of the activity or conduct being regulated or banned. Here owners of pit bulls or other banned breeds argue that the breed ban laws do not adequately define just what is a "pit bull" (or other banned breed) for purposes of the ban. Another argument is that the laws are too vague to help the dog-owning public or the BSL enforcement agency—such as animal control or police—to be able to identify whether a dog falls under the BSL if the dog was adopted with an unknown origin or is a mixed breed.

Federal courts

Sentell v. New Orleans and Carrollton Railroad Company
 
In Sentell v. New Orleans and Carrollton Railroad Company, 166 U.S. 698 (1897), Mr. Sentell sued the New Orleans and Carrollton Railroad Company to recover the value of his female Newfoundland dog that he alleged to have been negligently killed by the railroad company. The company claimed that Louisiana law held that only people who licensed their dogs were entitled to sue for compensation if the dog were killed, and that Mr. Sentell was not entitled to damages since he had not licensed his dog. The trial court in Orleans Parish found for Mr. Sentell and awarded him $250 US, so the railroad company appealed to the Louisiana Court of Appeal, which reversed the decision of the trial court. The Louisiana Supreme Court declined to hear the case, so Mr. Sentell then appealed to the Supreme Court of the United States, which agreed to hear the case.

The Supreme Court ruled against Mr. Sentell and established the precedent in U.S. jurisprudence that the regulation of dogs was within the police power of the state, and that the dogs were not as valuable as horses, cattle, sheep, or other domesticated animals:It is true that under the Fourteenth Amendment, no state can deprive a person of his life, liberty, or property without due process of law, but in determining what is due process of law, we are bound to consider the nature of the property, the necessity for its sacrifice, and the extent to which it has heretofore been regarded as within the police power. So far as property is inoffensive or harmless, it can only be condemned or destroyed by legal proceedings, with due notice to the owner; but, so far as it is dangerous to the safety or health of the community, due process of law may authorize its summary destruction....

Although dogs are ordinarily harmless, they preserve some of their hereditary wolfish instincts, which occasionally break forth in the destruction of sheep and other helpless animals. Others, too small to attack these animals, are simply vicious, noisy, and pestilent. As their depredations are often committed at night, it is usually impossible to identify the dog or to fix the liability upon the owner, who, moreover, is likely to be pecuniarily irresponsible [not responsible for financial compensation]. In short, the damages are usually such as are beyond the reach of judicial process, and legislation of a drastic nature is necessary to protect persons and property from destruction and annoyance. Such legislation is clearly within the police power of the state. It ordinarily takes the form of a license tax, and the identification of the dog by a collar and tag, upon which the name of the owner is sometimes required to be engraved, but other remedies are not uncommon.

Vanater v. Village of South Point

In Vanater v. Village of South Point, 717 F. Supp. 1236 (D. Ohio 1989), the Ohio federal district court held that the criminal ordinance of South Point, Ohio, prohibiting the owning or harboring of pit bull terriers within the village limits was not overly broad, concluding:
The Court concludes that the definitions of a Pit Bull Terrier in this Ordinance are not unconstitutionally vague.   An ordinary person could easily refer to a dictionary, a dog buyer's guide or any dog book for guidance and instruction;  also, the American Kennel Club and United Kennel Club have set forth standards for Staffordshire Bull Terriers and American Staffordshire Terriers to help determine whether a dog is described by any one of them. While it may be true that some definitions contain descriptions which lack "mathematical certainty," such precision and definiteness is not essential to constitutionality.
The court made the following findings of fact when it determined the village showed that pit bull terriers are uniquely dangerous and therefore, are proper subjects of the village's police power for the protection of the public's health and welfare:
 Pit Bulls ... possess the quality of gameness, which is not a totally clear concept, but which can be described as the propensity to catch and maul an attacked victim unrelentingly until death occurs, or as the continuing tenacity and tendency to attack repeatedly for the purpose of killing. It is clear that the unquantifiable, unpredictable aggressiveness and gameness of Pit Bulls make them uniquely dangerous.
 Pit Bulls have the following distinctive behavioral characteristics: a) grasping strength, b) climbing and hanging ability, c) weight pulling ability, d) a history of frenzy, which is the trait of unusual relentless ferocity or the extreme concentration on fighting and attacking, e) a history of catching, fighting, and killing instinct, f) the ability to be extremely destructive and aggressive, g) highly tolerant of pain, h) great biting strength, i) undying tenacity and courage and they are highly unpredictable.
 While these traits, tendencies or abilities are not unique to Pit Bulls exclusively, Pit Bulls will have these instincts and phenotypical characteristics; most significantly, such characteristics can be latent and may appear without warning or provocation.
 The breeding history of Pit Bulls makes it impossible to rule out a violent propensity for any one dog as gameness and aggressiveness can be hidden for years. Given the Pit Bull's genetical physical strengths and abilities, a Pit Bull always poses the possibility of danger; given the Pit Bull's breeding history as a fighting dog and the latency of its aggressiveness and gameness, the Pit Bull poses a danger distinct from other breeds of dogs which do not so uniformly share those traits.
 While Pit Bulls are not the only breed of dog which can be dangerous or vicious, it is reasonable to single out the breed to anticipate and avoid the dangerous aggressiveness which may be undetectable in a Pit Bull.

American Dog Owners Ass'n, Inc. v. Dade County, Fla.
In American Dog Owners Ass'n, Inc. v. Dade County, Fla., 728 F.Supp. 1533 (S.D.Fla.,1989), dog owners sued in the federal district court of Florida to prevent Dade County from enforcing a pit bull ban, claiming that there is no such thing as a pit bull dog but rather three separate breeds; however, their own expert witnesses repeatedly identified dogs from the three separate breeds as "pit bull dogs" during the trial. The court upheld the Dade County ordinance, concluding:
Based upon the substantial evidence presented at trial, this court finds that Dade County Ordinance No. 89-022 provides sufficient guidance to dog owners, both in its explicit reference to pit bull dogs, and in its definitional section, to enable pit bull owners to determine whether their dogs fall within the proscriptions of the ordinance....Certainly there are some applications of the ordinance which pass constitutional muster. As long as the enactment is not impermissibly vague in all its applications, this court must uphold its constitutionality. Upon consideration of the evidence presented at trial, the pleadings, memoranda, exhibits and arguments of counsel and upon application of the controlling authority, this court finds that plaintiffs have failed to meet their burden of proof and that the Court is required to uphold the constitutionality of Dade County Ordinance No. 089-22.

American Canine Federation, v. City of Aurora, CO
In American Canine Federation and Florence Vianzon v. City of Aurora, Colorado, 618 F.Supp.2d 1271 (2009), the plaintiffs sued in the United States District Court for the District of Colorado to prevent Aurora, Colorado, from enforcing a pit bull ban on the grounds that the law was unconstitutionally vague, that the law was an abuse of the city's police power, and that the ban represented an unconstitutional taking of property. The court rejected each of these claims based on existing legal precedents and upheld the city's ordinance.

State courts

Arkansas
In Holt v. City of Maumelle, 817 S.W.2d 208 (AR., 1991), Mr. Steele Holt sued the city of Maumelle, Arkansas, in 1988 in an attempt to have its prohibition against pit bulls overturned on the grounds that the ordinance was impermissibly vague, that it was unreasonable to ban pit bull–type dogs, and that the city's Board of Directors committed a breach of contract by passing a pit bull ordinance that it had previously agreed to forego; Mr. Holt also asked that the city pay compensatory damages, punitive damages, and his attorney's fees. The Pulaski County circuit court made a summary judgment dismissing the suit, and Mr. Holt appealed. In 1991, the Arkansas Supreme Court affirmed the circuit court's decision, finding that the pit bull ordinance was not impermissibly vague, that the restrictions were reasonable, and that any agreement made by the city to limit its own legislative powers was null and void since the city's first duty was to protect the public interest.

Colorado

In Colorado Dog Fanciers, Inc. v. City and County of Denver, 820 P.2d 644, Colo., 1991, the Colorado Supreme Court upheld a Denver city ordinance that dog owners had complained was unconstitutional, along the following lines:
 the dog owners claimed the ordinance was fundamentally unfair and therefore violated their right to procedural due process by forcing them to meet the burden of proving their dog was not a pit bull; however, the higher court found the ordinance was not fundamentally unfair provided the city was required to prove that dogs were pit bulls by the civil standard of "preponderance of evidence" rather than the criminal standard of "beyond a reasonable doubt."
 the dog owners claimed the ordinance violated substantive due process by creating a legislative presumption that a pit bull owner knowingly and voluntarily possesses a pit bull, and because it allowed the use of non-scientific evidence (e.g., expert opinion) to prove a dog is a pit bull; however, the higher court determined the ordinance preserves substantive due process by providing dog owners with a constitutionally adequate post-impoundment hearing, and reversed the trial court's imposition of a pre-impoundment hearing; in addition, the city was not required to prove a dog was a pit bull with mathematical certainty, and could use expert opinion and non-scientific evidence to prove its case in court.
 the dog owners felt the city ordinance treated all pit bulls and substantially similar dogs as inherently dangerous and was, therefore, unconstitutionally overbroad; however, the higher court ruled that outside the limited area of fundamental constitutional rights such as, for example, first amendment rights of speech or association, a statute may not be attacked as overbroad.
 the dog owners felt the term "pit bull" was imprecise and, thus, unconstitutionally vague because the average dog owner is not afforded fair warning of the act prohibited by the ordinance; however, the higher court found the standards for determining whether a dog is a pit bull are readily accessible to dog owners, and because most dog owners are capable of determining the breed or phenotype of their dog, the trial court properly determined that the ordinance provides adequate notice to dog owners and is not unconstitutionally vague.
 the dog owners argued that the ordinance violated the Equal Protection Clause by creating an irrational distinction between one who owns a dog with the physical characteristics of a pit bull and one who owns a dog lacking those characteristics; however, the higher court ruled that there was ample evidence to establish a rational relationship between the city's classification of certain dogs as pit bulls and the legitimate governmental purpose of protecting the health and safety of the city's residents and dogs, and thus the ordinance did not violate the dog owners' right to equal protection of the laws.
 the ordinance is an abuse of the city's police power and constitutes an unconstitutional taking of private property; however, the higher court noted that, in Colorado, dogs are accorded qualified property status and are, thus, subject to the proper exercise of police power for the protection of the public's health, safety, and welfare.
In City & County of Denver v. State of Colorado, 04CV3756, Denver challenged a 2004 law passed by the Colorado General Assembly that prohibited breed specific laws on the grounds that the state law violated the city's home rule authority in regard to animal control legislation. The Denver District Court Judge ruled in favor of Denver, finding that:
 the State failed to provide any new evidence to undermine the original 1990 trial court's decision regarding the differences between pit bulls and other dogs.
 the City had provided new evidence to provide additional support for the original 1990 trial court's decision.
 the 2000 CDC study on fatal dog bite attacks was irrelevant to the narrow issues identified in the 1990 trial court's decision
 the State of Colorado had failed to meet its burden of proof to establish beyond a reasonable doubt that no rational basis for Denver's pit bull ban existed

Florida
In State of Florida v. Peters, 534 So.2d 760 (Fla.App. 3 Dist. 1988), the Florida Third District Court of Appeal reviewed the city of North Miami ordinance regulating the ownership of pit bull dogs within the city limits, and held: (1) the ordinance did not violate the equal protection clause of the United States Constitution since the city's action in light of the evidence was neither arbitrary or irrational; (2) the ordinance's requirement to obtain liability insurance did not violate due process since the city had the right to regulate dogs under its police powers; (3) the definition of "pit bull" was not unconstitutionally vague, citing substantial precedent that laws requiring "substantial conformance" with a standard are not considered vague; and that mathematical certainty of a dog's identity as a pit bull was not required for a legal determination that a dog was in fact a pit bull.

Kansas
In Hearn v. City of Overland Park, 772 P.2d 758 (Kan. 1989), the Supreme Court of Kansas reviewed the ruling of a county court that overturned an ordinance of the city of Overland Park regulating the ownership of pit bull dogs within the city limits, and held: (1) The ordinance is not unconstitutionally vague or overbroad; (2) the ordinance does not violate the due process rights of plaintiffs under the United States and Kansas Constitutions; (3) the ordinance does not violate the equal protection clauses of the United States and Kansas Constitutions; and (4) the district court did not err in dismissing the plaintiffs' claim for damages pursuant to 42 U.S.C. § 1983 (1982).

Kentucky
In Bess v. Bracken County Fiscal Court, 210 S.W.3d 177 (Ky.App.,2006), the Kentucky Court of Appeals reviewed a Bracken County ordinance that banned pit bull terriers. The appellants (Mr. Bess and Mr. Poe) had sought a temporary injunction against the ordinance in the Bracken County Circuit Court. The court dismissed the motion on the grounds that the police power of the Fiscal Court allowed it to ban pit bull terriers and seize them without compensation. The appellants appealed on the grounds that:
 that the ordinance is inconsistent with KRS (Kentucky Revised Statutes) Chapter 258 and specifically with the definition of "vicious dog" contained in KRS 258.095;
 that it impermissibly allows the forfeiture of property without compensation;
 that it denies dog owners procedural due process; and
 that it impedes the right of nonresident owners of pit bull terriers to travel through Bracken County.
The Appeals court upheld the Bracken County ordinance, finding that:
 the breed-specific ordinance supplemented, rather than replaced or superseded, the definition of a "vicious dog" in the state statute;
 the banning of pit bull terriers was permissible under the police power, and that property seized under the police power was not subject to compensation;
 dog owners had the right of appeal to the Circuit Court under the ordinance, so the right of due process was preserved; and
 the ordinance did not discriminate against non-resident pit bull owners, and that the appellants had not provided any evidence that traveling with a pet "occupies a position fundamental to the concept of a federal union."

Massachusetts
In American Dog Owners Ass'n, Inc. v. City of Lynn, 404 Mass. 73, 533 N.E.2d 642 (Mass.,1989), the Massachusetts Supreme Judicial Court reviewed a series of ordinances enacted by Lynn, Massachusetts, targeting dogs variously referred to as "American Staffordshire Terrier[s], a/k/a American Pit Bull Terrier[s] or Bull Terrier[s]" (July 1985); "American Staffordshire, Staffordshire Pit Bull Terrier or Bull Terrier, hereinafter referred to as 'Pit Bulls'" (June 1986); and ""American Staffordshire, Staffordshire Pit Bull Terrier, Bull Terrier or any mixture thereof" (September 1986).

The Supreme Judicial Court determined that the issue was technically moot since each of the ordinances in question had been repealed by passage of a subsequent "pit bull" ordinance in June 1987; however, the court specifically observed (but did not rule) that the 1987 ordinance relied on the "common understanding and usage" of the names of the breeds in question, and warned that 
the Lynn Pit Bull ban ordinance depends for enforcement on the subjective understanding of dog officers of the appearance of an ill-defined "breed," leaves dog owners to guess at what conduct or dog "look" is prohibited, and requires "proof" of a dog's "type" which, unless the dog is registered, may be impossible to furnish. Such a law gives unleashed discretion to the dog officers charged with its enforcement, and clearly relies on their subjective speculation whether a dog's physical characteristics make it what is "commonly understood" to be a "Pit Bull."
As a result of this case, breed-specific legislation in the United States often relies on the published standards of the American Kennel Club and United Kennel Club to clearly identify the characteristics of dogs subject to regulation as "pit bulls."

New Mexico
In Garcia v. Village of Tijeras, 767 P.2d 355 (1988), the New Mexico Court of Appeals reviewed an ordinance of the Village of Tijeras that banned the ownership or possession of a breed of dog "known as American Pit Bull Terrier"; any dog found in violation of the ordinance after a court hearing would be euthanized. The court held against each of the defendants' claims and upheld the ordinance on the following grounds:
 The defendants claimed the ordinance violated their due process rights because it was vague in how it defined "pit bull"; however, the ordinance was not vague because vagueness applies in the sense of "to whom does the law apply." The law was therefore not vague since the defendants knew the ordinance applied to them.
 The defendants claimed the ordinance was not rationally related to the purpose of preventing pit bull attacks because environment and training are more important than genetics in determining how a dog acts; however, the court held there was substantial, credible evidence of breed-specific issues that the Village's actions were warranted.
 The defendants claimed that the ordinance violated equal protection rights because it singled out the owners of pit bulls; however, the court ruled that there was substantial, credible evidence that pit bulls posed a special threat to the people of Tijeras and that there were no grounds to overturn the ordinance.
 The defendants claimed the ordinance denied them procedural due process against the loss of property; however, the court ruled that the court hearings specified by the ordinance were sufficient due process to ensure the owners had "the opportunity to be heard and present evidence would occur at a meaningful time, that is, prior to the destruction of the dog."
 The defendants claimed the ordinance would deprive them of property without compensation; however, the court ruled that well-established precedent did not require compensation for property seized under a city's police powers.

New York

The New York City Housing Authority updated their pet policy in 2010 to exclude dogs over 25 pounds and specifically prohibit Doberman Pinschers, Pit bulls, Rottweilers, and any mixes thereof.

Ohio
In Toledo v. Tellings – Reversed – 871 N.E.2d 1152 (Ohio, 2007), the Ohio Sixth District Court of Appeal struck down a portion of the Toledo, Ohio, municipal code that limited people to owning only one pit bull. The law relied on a state definition of a vicious dog as one that has bitten or killed a human, has killed another dog, or "belongs to a breed that is commonly known as a Pit Bull dog." The court held that the legislation was void for violation of a Pit Bull owner's right to due process since the owner could not appeal a designation of his pet as a vicious dog. The court held that,"Since we conclude that there is no evidence that pit bulls are inherently dangerous or vicious, then the city ordinance limitation on ownership is also arbitrary, unreasonable and discriminatory."

The Supreme Court of Ohio reversed the Court of Appeal (Toledo v. Tellings, 114 Ohio St.3d 278, 2007-Ohio-3724), and reinstated the Toledo ordinance for the following reasons:
 {¶ 30} The court of appeals found R.C. 955.11 and 955.22 and Toledo Municipal Code 505.14 unconstitutional with respect to procedural due process, substantive due process, and equal protection, and under the void-for-vagueness doctrine. We disagree.
 {¶ 31} First, the court of appeals declared that the laws violated procedural due process pursuant to State v. Cowan, 103 Ohio St.3d 144, 2004-Ohio-4777, 814 N.E.2d 846. In Cowan, a Portage County deputy dog warden determined two dogs to be vicious following a complaint that the dogs had attacked a woman. Id. at ¶ 1. The dogs were determined to be vicious because of the alleged attack, not because they were pit bulls. We held that when a dog is determined to be "vicious" under R.C. 955.11(A)(4)(a), procedural due process requires that the owner have notice and an opportunity to be heard before the owner is charged with a crime. Id. at ¶ 13.
 {¶ 32} In Cowan, the dogs were determined to be vicious under the first two subsections of R.C. 955.11(A)(4)(a) because they had caused injury to a person. Thus, the case concerned the dog warden's unilateral classification of the dogs as vicious. However, in this case, the "vicious dogs" at issue are those classified as pit bulls under the third subsection of R.C. 955.11(A)(4)(a). Unlike the situation in Cowan, the General Assembly has classified pit bulls generally as vicious; there is no concern about unilateral administrative decision-making on a case-by-case basis. The clear statutory language alerts all owners of pit bulls that failure to abide by the laws related to vicious dogs and pit bulls is a crime. Therefore, the laws do not violate the rights of pit bull owners to procedural due process.
 {¶ 33} Second, R.C. 955.11 and 955.22 and Toledo Municipal Code 505.14 are not unconstitutional for violating substantive due process or equal protection rights. Laws limiting rights, other than fundamental rights, are constitutional with respect to substantive due process and equal protection if the laws are rationally related to a legitimate goal of government. See State v. Thompkins (1996), 75 Ohio St.3d 558, 560–561, 664 N.E.2d 926. As we discussed previously when evaluating whether the statutes and ordinance in question are valid exercises of state and city police power, R.C. 955.11 and 955.22 January Term, 2007 and Toledo Municipal Code 505.14 are rationally related to a legitimate government interest.
 {¶ 34} Finally, the court of appeals erred in holding that R.C. 955.11 and 955.22 and Toledo Municipal Code 505.14 are void for vagueness. This court has previously held that the term "pit bull" is not unconstitutionally void for vagueness. In State v. Anderson, we stated: "In sum, we believe that the physical and behavioral traits of pit bulls together with the commonly available knowledge of dog breeds typically acquired by potential dog owners or otherwise possessed by veterinarians or breeders are sufficient to inform a dog owner as to whether he owns a dog commonly known as a pit bull dog." 57 Ohio St.3d 168, 173, 566 N.E.2d 1224.
 {¶ 35} In conclusion, the state and the city of Toledo possess the constitutional authority to exercise police powers that are rationally related to a legitimate interest in public health, safety, morals, or general welfare. Here, evidence proves that pit bulls cause more damage than other dogs when they attack, cause more fatalities in Ohio than other dogs, and cause Toledo police officers to fire their weapons more often than people or other breeds of dogs cause them to fire their weapons. We hold that the state of Ohio and the city of Toledo have a legitimate interest in protecting citizens from the dangers associated with pit bulls, and that R.C. 955.11(A)(4)(a)(iii) and 955.22 and Toledo Municipal Code 505.14 are rationally related to that interest and are constitutional.
Mr. Tellings appealed the case to the Supreme Court of the United States, which declined to hear the case.

Texas
In City of Richardson v. Responsible Dog Owners of Texas, 794 S.W.2d 17 (Tex. 1990), several people ("Responsible Dog Owners") sued the city of Richardson, Texas, to prevent it from enforcing restrictions on pit bulls within its city limits on the grounds that the Texas state legislature had passed legislation preempting the a city's power to adopt an ordinance regulating the keeping of dogs. The trial court granted summary judgment in favor of the city, but the Texas Court of Appeals reversed the trial court's decision (781 S.W.2d 667). The Supreme Court of Texas reversed the Court of Appeals and upheld the original decision on the grounds that
Under article XI, section 5 of the Texas Constitution, home-rule cities have broad discretionary powers provided that no ordinance "shall contain any provision inconsistent with the Constitution of the State, or of the general laws enacted by the Legislature of this State...."  Thus, the mere fact that the legislature has enacted a law addressing a subject does not mean that the subject matter is completely preempted....Although there is a small area of overlap in the provisions of the narrow statute and the broader ordinance, we hold that it is not fatal.

Texas Health and Safety Code
In the state of Texas, the State Health and Safety Code prohibits breed-specific legislation as stated
Sec. 822.047.  LOCAL REGULATION OF DANGEROUS DOGS.  A county or municipality may place additional requirements or restrictions on dangerous dogs if the requirements or restrictions:
(1)  are not specific to one breed or several breeds of dogs;  and
(2)  are more stringent than restrictions provided by this subchapter.

Added by Acts 1991, 72nd Leg., ch. 916, Sec. 1, eff. September 1, 1991.

Washington
In McQueen v. Kittitas County, 115 Wash. 672, 677 (1921), the Washington Supreme Court established the broadly accepted precedent that cities have the power to regulate dogs, even to the point of banning specific breeds.[D]ogs do not stand on the same plane as horses, cattle, sheep, and other domesticated animals...On the general question, it is the almost universal current of authority that dogs are a subject of the police power of the state, and their keeping subject to any kind of license or regulation, even to absolute prohibition...since dogs are a subject of the police power, we see no reason why the legislature may not make distinctions between breeds, sizes and the localities in which they may be kept. The object of the statute is protection. The purpose is to prevent injuries to persons and property by dogs. Any distinction founded upon reasons at least, is therefore valid..."

In American Dog Owners Ass'n v. City of Yakima, 777 P.2d 1046 (Wash.1989, en banc), the Washington Supreme Court reviewed a pit bull ban in the city of Yakima. The dog owners asked a state court to prevent Yakima from enforcing its ban on pit bull dogs. The trial court issued a temporary injunction against the city and accepted motions for summary judgment from both the dog owners and the city. The court decided in favor of the city and lifted the injunction, whereupon the dog owners appealed to the Washington Supreme Court on the grounds that the ordinance was vague because a person of ordinary intelligence could not tell what was prohibited, and that the trial court had improperly decided the summary judgment in favor of the city.

The Washington Supreme Court ruled that the ordinance was not unconstitutionally vague because it specified the dog breeds that together fit the definition of "pit bull", whereas an earlier case in Massachusetts, American Dog Owners Ass'n, Inc. v. Lynn, 404 Mass. 73, 533 N.E.2d 642 (1989), had resulted in the pit bull ban being annulled because the ordinance did not specify in sufficient detail what a "pit bull" was; in addition, the higher court ruled that the summary judgment had been properly awarded, thus upholding the Yakima pit bull ban.

Wisconsin
In Dog Federation of Wisconsin, Inc. v. City of South Milwaukee, 178 Wis.2d 353, 504 N.W.2d 375 (Wis.App.,1993), the Wisconsin Court of Appeals reviewed the appeal of a trial court decision upholding a pit bull ban in South Milwaukee, Wisconsin. The Court of Appeals upheld the trial court on the following grounds:
 The dog owners claimed that the definition of "pit bull" in the ordinance was too vague in its description of a "pit bull"; however, the Court of Appeals found that the ordinance's reference to the breed descriptions of the American Kennel Club and United Kennel Club were enough to allow someone to know whether they owned a "pit bull" or not
 The dog owners claimed the pit bull ban ordinance was overbroad because it treated "all pit bulls as if they are inherently dangerous, and more prone to cause harm than other dogs as a matter of law"; however, the higher court found that the prohibition against "overbroad" ordinances protected only fundamental rights such as the freedom of speech, and that there was no fundamental right to own a particular breed of dog.
 The dog owners claimed the pit bull ban violated their right to equal protection since pit bulls were singled out for prohibition, for which there was "no scientific or empirical basis" and that dangerousness is a function of "environment, training, and upbringing." The Court of Appeals found that the evidence of the unique danger posed by pit bull–type dogs was sufficient that the dog owners could not prove beyond a reasonable doubt that the discrimination was unfounded, as required by previous court precedent.

See also

 List of dog fighting breeds

References

Dog law

de:Rasseliste
es:Perro peligroso